Chaetosphaeridiales is an order of green algae.

References

Charophyta
Green algae orders